Robert G. Ashley (born July 4, 1953, Charleston, West Virginia) is an American politician from West Virginia. A Republican, Ashley served in the West Virginia Senate for the 3rd district between 2015 and 2017. He was previously a member of the West Virginia House of Delegates, representing the 11th district between 2001 and 2015 and the 28th district from January 1985 until January 1999.

Education
Ashley earned his BBA from Marshall University.

Elections
2012 Ashley was unopposed for the May 8, 2012 Republican Primary, winning with 1,475 votes; returning 2010 opponent Mark Myers ran as the Mountain Party candidate, setting up a rematch. Ashley won the November 6, 2012 General election with 4,699 votes (81.1%) against Myers.
1980s and 1990s Ashley was initially elected in the 1984 Republican Primary and November 6, 1984 General election, and re-elected in the general elections of November 4, 1986, November 8, 1988, November 6, 1990, November 2, 1992, November 8, 1994, and November 5, 1996.
1998 Ashley was unopposed for the 1998 Republican Primary but lost the November 3, 1998 General election to Democratic nominee Oscar Hines.
2000 Ashley and Representative Hines were both unopposed for their 2000 primaries, setting up a rematch; Ashley won the November 7, 2000 General election against Representative Hines.
2002 Ashley was unopposed for the 2002 Republican Primary and was re-elected in the November 5, 2002 General election against Democratic nominee Bill Groves.
2004 Ashley was unopposed for both the 2004 Republican Primary and the November 2, 2004 General election.
2006 Ashley was unopposed for both the 2006 Republican Primary and the November 7, 2006 General election.
2008 Ashley was unopposed for both the May 13, 2008 Republican Primary, winning with 1,513 votes, and the November 4, 2008 General election, winning with 4,983 votes.
2010 Ashley was unopposed for the May 11, 2010 Republican Primary, winning with 1,069 votes, and won the November 2, 2010 General election with 3,266 votes (80.9%) against Mountain Party candidate Mark Myers.

References

External links
Official page at the West Virginia Legislature
Robert Ashley at Ballotpedia
Bob Ashley at the National Institute on Money in State Politics

1953 births
Living people
Marshall University alumni
Republican Party members of the West Virginia House of Delegates
Politicians from Charleston, West Virginia
People from Spencer, West Virginia
Republican Party West Virginia state senators
21st-century American politicians